Kenth Rönn (born 14 November 1953) is a Swedish bobsledder. He competed at the 1976 Winter Olympics and the 1980 Winter Olympics.

References

1953 births
Living people
Swedish male bobsledders
Olympic bobsledders of Sweden
Bobsledders at the 1976 Winter Olympics
Bobsledders at the 1980 Winter Olympics
Sportspeople from Uppsala
20th-century Swedish people